Jean-Philippe Goude is a French composer and keyboardist, born in Paris in 1952.

Early years  
 1969: first compositions
 1975: composition and recording of the soundtrack for Frankenstein, a play by Philippe Adrien at Théâtre de la Roquette (Paris)
 1975: publication of the disc Jeunes Années (Saravah)
 1976 to 1979: Participation in the group Weidorje - keyboards and composition
 1979: publication of the disc Drônes
 1979: artistic direction, realization and arrangements for Dick Annegarn.
 1979 to 1983: participation in the group Odeurs- compositions, arrangements, artistic direction
 1979 to 1985: artistic direction, realization, arrangements and orchestration on the albums by Renaud:
Marche à l'ombre
Le retour de Gérard Lambert
Morgane de toi
Mistral gagnant
Putain de camion

1986
 Stopped activities in the domain of songs
 Two orientations:
Resumption of work on composition
Activities in soundtrack work for films

Creations and publications
 Salve Regina for contralto, violin, cello and piano
World premiere April 1992, at Théâtre des Champs-Élysées (Paris) within the framework of the festival Musicora. Interpreted by Gérard Lesne (contralto),  Johannes Leertouwer (violin), Bruno Cocset (cello) and Marie-Pierre Brun (piano)
 1992: publication of the CD  De Anima
 1994: publication of the CD Ainsi de Nous
 1994: creation of the ensemble Jean-Philippe Goude
 1996: publication of the CD La Divine Nature des Choses.
 2001: publication of the CD  Rock de Chambre

Music for films
“Au crépuscule des temps” (Sarah Lévy),
“Nos enfants chéris” (Benoît Cohen),
“Les gardiens de la mer” (Christiane Le Hérissey),
“Une affaire de goût” (Bernard Rapp),
“Le créateur” (Albert Dupontel),
“Marie Lester” TV series / France 3,
"Une semaine au salon” (Dominique Baron),
“Tiré à part” (Bernard Rapp),
“Sortez des rangs” (Jean-Denis Robert),
“Comme par hasard” (Maurice Dugowson),
“Puzzle” (Maurice Dugowson),
“Chantons en chœur” (Maurice Dugowson),
“Elle voit des nains partout” (Jean-Claude Sussfeld),
“Circulez y'a rien à voir” (Patrice Leconte),
“Viens chez moi j'habite chez une copine” (Patrice Leconte), etc.

Music for commercials
SFR, Bridélice, Maille, Société générale, Chanel n°5, France inter, Télérama, Gayelord Hauser, Arvie, Tefal, Lacoste, Valda, Michelin, Rivoire & carret, Modes & travaux, Suprême des ducs, Parc Astérix, Prince de Lu, Gitane, Moët & Chandon, UNICEF, Motta, Arthur martin, Alcatel, Flunch, Seat, Citrœn, Saint-Mamet, Calgon, Burov, Lancôme, Esso, Diligo, Louis de Porteere, La Poste, Cetelem, Legal, Peugeot, Keranove, Crédit Mutuel, Sojasun, Pim’s, Péchiney, Cadbury, Lesieur/Isio 4, Haslerky, Stringers, Mr Propre, Aigle, Seb, Revian, Yoplait, Herta, St-Agur, Pal, Femmes, Paysan Breton, Interflora, Picnic Break, Nutella, Renault, Télé Loisirs, Philtre d’Or, Les 3 Suisses, Crédit Lyonnais, Champion, Candia, GMF, Sephora, Yves Saint-Laurent, etc. His work called "Market Diktat Song" was very appreciated by brazilian people through the commercial television of Fiat Touro (2016-2017). He became well known in Brazil after this job.

Music for television
The book of books, France Europe Express, Compléments d’enquête, Un siècle d’écrivains, Caractères, Tranche de cake, 1992 Summer Olympics, 1994 Winter Olympics, Taxi, Permission de minuit, A la folie..., Quand je serais grand..., My télé is rich, Giga, Tranche de l'art, Objectif Tintin, Décryptages, Planète chaude, Short, Debout les p'tits bouts,  Jeux d’encre, La preuve par trois, la 5e rencontre, 7 d’or, Coté 5e, Ciné Week-End, Régions.Com, Une fois/mois, etc.

Theme music for television
Antenne 2, FR3, La 5 (2 habillages), RFO, CFI, Canal J (2 habillages), RTL TV, TV10, C'était hier, Bravo, Canal humour, Kontakt TV, FA, TV Club, Satfin, Canal A, Radio NOVA, La 5e, etc.

Awards
 1989: Gold Award of the B.D.A. of Los Angeles for the soundtrack of Frédéric Mitterrand's Late Pass.
 1991: Prize of the Society of authors, composers and editors of music in 1st Festival of Biarritz, for original music in the film EDF-Industries
 1997: **** (four stars)  in The World of Music for the CD La Divine Nature des Choses
 2003: Prize for the soundtrack in 1st Festival Cinématographique de Saint-Malo, for the soundtrack for the film Nos enfants chéris

External links
 Official website of Jean-Philippe Goude
 Hopi Mesa website

1952 births
French composers
French male composers
Living people
Musicians from Paris